Ravi Kumar (born 11 April 2002) is an Indian footballer who plays as a goalkeeper for I-League club RoundGlass Punjab.

Career

Pailan Arrows
Kumar signed for Pailan Arrows in 2010 when they were called AIFF XI. Kumar made his professional debut for Pailan Arrows in the I-League on 2 February 2012 against reigning champions Salgaocar at the Salt Lake Stadium; Kumar managed to keep the clean-sheet as Arrows drew the match 0–0.

Sporting Goa
On 18 July it was confirmed that Kumar has signed for Sporting Goa with Deepak Devrani. 
He made his debut for Sporting Goa in the I-League on 21 September 2013 against Mumbai F.C. at the Balewadi Sports Complex; as Sporting Goa drew the match 1–1.

Delhi Dynamos (loan)
In July 2015 Kumar was drafted to play for Delhi Dynamos in the 2015 Indian Super League.

Minerva Punjab (loan)
In December 2016, Kumar signed in the favor of New I league team Minerva Punjab on loan from Sporting Goa for 2016-17 I-League.

NorthEast United
On 23 July 2017, Kumar was picked by Northeast United FC in Hero ISL draft.

Odisha
On 29 June 2020 , Ravi Kumar joined Odisha FC on a two-year deal.

International
Kumar made his international debut at the under-19 level for India U19 against Turkmenistan in 2012 AFC U-19 Championship qualification on 31 October 2012.

Career statistics

Club

References

Indian footballers
1993 births
Living people
I-League players
Indian Arrows players
Sporting Clube de Goa players
Odisha FC players
Association football goalkeepers
Footballers from Uttar Pradesh
India youth international footballers
Footballers at the 2014 Asian Games
Asian Games competitors for India
RoundGlass Punjab FC players
NorthEast United FC players
Mumbai City FC players